This Is Not a War Story is a 2021 American war drama film written by, directed by, edited by and starring Talia Lugacy.

Summary
A group of ragtag New York veterans create art that dealt with the aftermath of war.

Cast
Talia Lugacy as Isabelle Casale
Sam Adegoke as Will LaRue
Danny Ramirez as Timothy Reyes
Frances Fisher as Dora Casale
Patrick Stoffer as Malloy
Brian Delate as Ed

Production
Rosario Dawson served as an executive producer of the film. WarnerMedia OneFifty and HBO Max acquired the distribution rights to the film in September 2021.

Release and reception
The film premiered at the 2021 SF Indie Fest. It was eventually released on November 3, 2021.

The film has a 100 percent rating on Rotten Tomatoes based on 31 reviews.

Peter Sobczynski of RogerEbert.com awarded the film three stars, calling it "an ambitious and thoughtful attempt to deal with veterans coming to terms with what they have seen and done..."

Bobby LePire of Film Threat rated the film a 9.5 out of 10 and wrote, "This Is Not A Story boasts stunning acting, fantastic music, a heartfelt plot, and impeccable directing. It is a remarkable sophomore feature for writer-director-actor-producer Talia Lugacy, her first in 14 years."

Accolades
The film was awarded prizes at the Urbanworld Film Festival, Tallgrass Film Festival, SF Independent Film Festival, Indie Street Film Festival, Atlanta Underground Film Festival, Portland Film Festival, and Workers Unite Film Festival.

In December 2021, the film was nominated for the John Cassavetes Award at the 2022 Film Independent Spirit Awards.

References

External links
 
 
 Official trailer

2021 films
2021 drama films
American war drama films
2020s English-language films
2020s American films